Black Hen Music is a Canadian independent record label founded in Vancouver, British Columbia in 1995. The music label was established by record producer and musician Steve Dawson of the band Zubot and Dawson. Black Hen Music began releasing albums in 1996 and is distributed in Canada by Fontana North, in Europe and the UK by Continental Record Services, and in the US by Burnside Distribution.

Awards
Black Hen artists have received the following awards and nominations:

5 Juno Awards
11 Juno Nominations
1 Maple Blues Award
3 Canadian Folk Music Awards
1 SOCAN #1 Award
1 Grand Prix de Jazz de Montreal
8 Western Canadian Music Awards
24 Western Canadian Music Award nominations
2 Canadian Independent Music Awards

Roster
 Coco Love Alcorn
 Geoff Berner
 Bottleneck
 Jim Byrnes
 Steve Dawson
 The Deep Dark Woods
 Andrew Downing
 Great Uncles of the Revolution
 John Wort Hannam
 Paul Humphrey
 Shuyler Jansen
 Old Man Luedecke
 Cara Luft
 Big Dave McLean
 Linda McRae
 Kelly Joe Phelps
 Tim Posgate
 Don Rooke
 The Sojourners
 Chris Tarry
 David Wall
 Jenny Whiteley
 Joey Wright
 Zubot and Dawson

See also

 List of record labels

External links
 Official site

Record labels established in 1995
Canadian independent record labels
Folk record labels
Blues record labels
Companies based in Vancouver